Ciaran McManus is an Irish former Gaelic footballer who played for the Tubber club and at senior level for the Offaly county team from 1996 to 2011 and won a Leinster Senior Football Championship medal in 1997 and a National Football League  Division 1 in 1998 and Division 2 in 2004.

Before breaking into the senior team he helped Offaly to win the Leinster Under-21 Football Championship in 1995.

He played for Ireland in the International Rules Series in 2001, 2002, 2003, 2004, 2005, 2006 and 2007.

He also played for UCD, winning a Dublin Senior Football Championship in 2002.

In 2004, McManus became involved in a dispute with the Offaly County Board over its selection of a new manager.

Honours
 Leinster Under-21 Football Championship (1): 1995
 Leinster Senior Football Championship (1): 1997
 National Football League, Division 1 (1): 1998
 National Football League, Division 2 (1): 2004
 National Football League, Division 4 (1): 1997
 Sigerson Cup (1): 1995
 Dublin Senior Football Championship (1): 2002
 Railway Cup (4):

References

Year of birth missing (living people)
Living people
Tubber Gaelic footballers
Offaly inter-county Gaelic footballers
UCD Gaelic footballers
Irish international rules football players
Irish civil engineers